Assam earthquake may refer to:

 1897 Assam earthquake
 1947 Assam earthquake
 1950 Assam–Tibet earthquake
 2021 Assam earthquake